Ballyanthus is a genus of flowering plants belonging to the family Apocynaceae.

Its native range is Somalia.

Species:

Ballyanthus major 
Ballyanthus prognathus

References

Apocynaceae
Apocynaceae genera